French legislative elections took place on 18 November and 25 November 1962 to elect the second National Assembly of the Fifth Republic.

Since 1959 and the change of Algerian policy (Charles de Gaulle decided in favour of the "self-government" and "Algerian Algeria"), France had faced bomb attacks by the Secret Armed Organization (Organisation armée secrète or OAS) which opposed the independence of Algeria, negotiated by the FLN with the March 1962 Evian agreements and approved by referendum by the French people. This policy was disapproved by some members of the "Presidential Majority".

Simultaneously, when Georges Pompidou replaced Michel Debré as prime minister, the center-right parties (MRP and CNIP) left the majority due to de Gaulle's eurosceptic declaration. Like the Left, they denounced the presidentialization of the regime.

On 22 August de Gaulle escaped from an assassination attempt by the OAS in Le Petit-Clamart. He subsequently announced a controversial referendum in which he proposed the election of the president of the French Republic under universal suffrage. The presidential majority composed of the UNR and the Independent Republicans (RI) (which came from a CNIP split) campaigned for a "yes", while all the other parties formed a "coalition of no" and brought down Pompidou's cabinet by a vote of no confidence (motion de censure).

However, de Gaulle finally won the referendum and dissolved the National Assembly. During the legislative campaign, all the parties, except the UNR and the RI, criticized the "personal power" which they believed distorted France's Republican institutions. In the French political culture and in their mind, Republicanism was inseparable from parliamentary democracy and the reinforcement of the presidential powers was associated with Bonapartism. Contrary to the previous legislative election, the left-wing parties finalized an electoral agreement. The subsequent legislative elections saw advances for the left-wing opposition. However, conservative voters sanctioned the center-right parties, preferring to vote for the Gaullist party. Pompidou became Prime Minister again.

Results 

|-
! style="background-color:#E9E9E9;text-align:left;vertical-align:top;" rowspan=2 colspan=3 width=600 |Parties and coalitions
! style="background-color:#E9E9E9;text-align:center;" colspan=2 |1st round
! style="background-color:#E9E9E9;text-align:center;" colspan=2 |2nd round
! style="background-color:#E9E9E9" rowspan=2|Total seats
|-
! style="background-color:#E9E9E9;text-align:right;" |Votes
! style="background-color:#E9E9E9;text-align:right;" |%
! style="background-color:#E9E9E9;text-align:right;" |Votes
! style="background-color:#E9E9E9;text-align:right;" |%
|-
|style="background-color:#0000C8"|
| style="text-align:left;" | Union for the New Republic-Democratic Union of Labour (Union pour la nouvelle République-Union démocratique du travail)
| style="text-align:right;" | UNR-UDT
| style="text-align:right;" | 5,855,744
| style="text-align:right;" | 31.94
| style="text-align:right;" | 6,169,890
| style="text-align:right;" | 40.36
| style="text-align:right;" | 233
|-
|style="background-color:#00CCCC"|
| style="text-align:left;" | Popular Republican Movement (Mouvement républicain populaire)
| style="text-align:right;" | MRP
| style="text-align:right;" | 1,665,695
| style="text-align:right;" | 9.08
| style="text-align:right;" | 821,635
| style="text-align:right;" | 5.45
| style="text-align:right;" | 36
|-
|style="background-color:#1E90FF"|
| style="text-align:left;" | National Centre of Independents and Peasants (Centre national des indépendants et paysans)
| style="text-align:right;" | CNIP
| style="text-align:right;" | 1,404,177
| style="text-align:right;" | 7.66
| style="text-align:right;" | -
| style="text-align:right;" | -
| style="text-align:right;" | 28
|-
|style="background-color:"|
| style="text-align:left;" | Independent Republicans (Républicains indépendants)
| style="text-align:right;" | RI
| style="text-align:right;" | 1,089,348
| style="text-align:right;" | 5.94
| style="text-align:right;" | 1,444,666
| style="text-align:right;" | 9.46
| style="text-align:right;" | 27
|- style="background-color:lightblue"
| style="text-align:left;" colspan=2|Total Right ("Presidential Majority", MRP and CNIP)
|
| style="text-align:right;" | 10,014,964
| style="text-align:right;" | 54.62
| style="text-align:right;" | 8,436,191
| style="text-align:right;" | 55.27
| style="text-align:right;" | 324
|-
|style="background-color:#FF0000"|
| style="text-align:left;" | French Communist Party (Parti communiste français)
| style="text-align:right;" | PCF
| style="text-align:right;" | 4,003,553
| style="text-align:right;" | 21.84
| style="text-align:right;" | 3,195,763
| style="text-align:right;" | 20.94
| style="text-align:right;" | 41
|-
|style="background-color:"|
| style="text-align:left;" | French Section of the Workers' International (Section française de l'Internationale ouvrière)
| style="text-align:right;" | SFIO
| style="text-align:right;" | 2,298,729
| style="text-align:right;" | 12.54
| style="text-align:right;" | 2,264,011
| style="text-align:right;" | 14.83
| style="text-align:right;" | 65
|-
|style="background-color:#FFBF00"|
| style="text-align:left;" | Radical Party (Parti radical)
| style="text-align:right;" | PR
| style="text-align:right;" | 1,429,649
| style="text-align:right;" | 7.79
| style="text-align:right;" | 1,172,711
| style="text-align:right;" | 7.68
| style="text-align:right;" | 44
|-
|style="background-color:#DE3163"|
| style="text-align:left;" | Unified Socialist Party (Parti socialiste unifié)
| style="text-align:right;" | PSU
| style="text-align:right;" | 427,467
| style="text-align:right;" | 2.33
| style="text-align:right;" | 138,131
| style="text-align:right;" | 0.90
| style="text-align:right;" | 2
|- style="background-color:pink"
| style="text-align:left;" colspan=2| Total Left
|
| style="text-align:right;" | 8,159,398
| style="text-align:right;" | 44.50
| style="text-align:right;" | 6,770,616
| style="text-align:right;" | 44.34
| style="text-align:right;" | 152
|-
|style="background-color:#704214"|
| style="text-align:left;" | Far-Right
|
| style="text-align:right;" | 159,429
| style="text-align:right;" | 0.87
| style="text-align:right;" | 52,245
| style="text-align:right;" | 0.34
| style="text-align:right;" | -
|-
|
| style="text-align:left;" | Total
|
| style="text-align:right;" | 18,333,791
| style="text-align:right;" | 100.00
| style="text-align:right;" | 15,208,101
| style="text-align:right;" | 100.00
| style="text-align:right;" | 476
|-
| style="text-align:left;" colspan=8 | Abstention: 31.28% (1st round); 27.90% (2nd round)
|}

National Assembly by Parliamentary Group

References

1962
Legislative election
French legislative election